
Once in a While is a 1978 studio album by Dean Martin, produced by Jimmy Bowen. It was released four years after it was recorded.

The album consists of traditional pop music standards, recorded in country pop arrangements. Many of the songs were associated with singer Bing Crosby.

It was reissued on CD by Capitol Records in 2006 and Hip-O Records in 2009.

Reception

William Ruhlmann on Allmusic.com gave the album two and a half stars out of five. Ruhlmann said that "Martin had no trouble negotiating such arrangements, though, and his familiarity with the songs themselves made his interpretations more comfortable than ever".

Track listing 
 "Twilight on the Trail" (Louis Alter, Sidney Mitchell) - 4:18
 "Love Thy Neighbor" (Mack Gordon, Harry Revel) - 2:42
 "Without a Word of Warning" (Gordon, Revel) - 2:50
 "That Old Gang of Mine" (Mort Dixon, Ray Henderson, Billy Rose) - 2:28
 "The Day You Came Along" (Sam Coslow, Arthur Johnston) - 2:58
 "It's Magic" (Sammy Cahn, Jule Styne) - 2:27
 "If I Had You" (Irving King, Ted Shapiro) - 2:32
 "Only Forever" (Johnny Burke, James V. Monaco) - 3:12
 "I Cried for You" (Gus Arnheim, Arthur Freed, Abe Lyman) - 2:55
 "Once in a While" (Michael Edwards, Bud Green) - 2:49

Personnel 
 Dean Martin – vocals
Phil Baugh - musicians
Pete Carpenter
Michael Lang
Don Lanier
Larrie Londin – drums
Willie Ornelas
Joe Osborn – bass
Reinhold Press, Jr.
Don Randi – keyboards
Bobby Wood – keyboards
Neil Levang - guitar
Hal Blaine - drums
Ron Slenzak - photography
Alan Moore - string arrangements
Tim Baty - background vocals
Lea Jane Berinati
Thomas Brannon
Janie Fricke
Ginger Holladay – backing vocals 
 Jimmy Bowen - record producer

References

1976 albums
Dean Martin albums
Albums produced by Jimmy Bowen
Reprise Records albums